Abandonment (Italian: Abbandono) is a 1940 Italian historical drama film directed by Mario Mattoli and starring Corinne Luchaire, George Rigaud and Maria Denis. It was shot at the Cinecittà Studios in Rome. The film's sets were designed by the art director Guido Fiorini.

Plot
In the 1830s, there is shock when the son of a wealthy shipowner returns from a distant voyage with a new wife.

Cast
 Corinne Luchaire as Anna 
 George Rigaud as Capitano Stefano Courier 
 Maria Denis as Maria, sua sorella 
 Camillo Pilotto as Moran
 Lia Orlandini as La signora Courier
 Osvaldo Valenti as Leonard
 Enrico Glori as Il marito di Maria
 Sandro Ruffini as Pierre Courier
 Giulietta De Riso as Dolores
 Nerio Bernardi as Ridaud
 Carlo Duse as Richard
 Nino Marchesini as Il medico

References

Bibliography
  Enrico Lancia & Fabio Melelli. Attori stranieri del nostro cinema. Gremese Editore, 2006.

External links

1940 films
1940s historical drama films
1940 drama films
Italian black-and-white films
Films directed by Mario Mattoli
1940s Italian-language films
Films shot at Cinecittà Studios
Films set in the 1830s
Italian historical drama films
1940s Italian films